The Samtskhe–Javakheti History Museum is a museum in Akhaltsikhe, Samtskhe–Javakheti, Georgia, founded in 1923. In its current renovated form, the museum was opened in 2012 as part of the Georgian National Museum network. It is located on the territory of the reconstructed fortress of Akhaltsikhe, known as "Rabati".

References

Museums in Georgia (country)
Buildings and structures in Samtskhe–Javakheti
Tourist attractions in Samtskhe–Javakheti